Union, University & Schools Club is a private, social club founded in 1857. and based in Sydney at 25 Bent Street. The club was formed by a merger between the Union Club and the University & Schools Club in January 2007. Members must be nominated and seconded and the annual membership  fee is only disclosed to potential members. The club has reciprocal relationships with other like minded clubs around the world.

See also
 List of India's gentlemen's clubs
 List of London's gentlemen's clubs
 List of American gentlemen's clubs

References

External links 
 The Union, University & Schools Club 
 The former Union Club club-house Powerhouse Museum Collection
 The former University Club club-house Power Museum Collection

1857 establishments in Australia
Organizations established in 1857
Organisations based in Sydney
Gentlemen's clubs in Australia
Buildings and structures in Sydney